William T. Smith (September 17, 1928 – March 20, 2018) was an American wrestler and Olympic champion in freestyle wrestling at the 1952 Olympic Games. 

Smith was born in Portland, Oregon and graduated from Thomas Jefferson Senior High School in Council Bluffs, Iowa. He then enrolled at Iowa State Teachers College (now the University of Northern Iowa), where Smith won back-to-back NCAA wrestling titles at 165 pounds in 1949 and 1950.  As a team, Iowa State Teachers College finished as NCAA Runners-Up in 1949 and NCAA Champions in 1950.  He also won three Amateur Athletic Union (AAU) national titles. In 1978, Smith was inducted into the National Wrestling Hall of Fame as a Distinguished Member.  Thomas Jefferson High School dedicated their Wrestling room shortly after they rebuilt their Activities Center Building in 2008. William Smith died on March 20, 2018, at the age of 89. Intermat Wrestling website posted an article about Bill citing all of his accomplishments.

Olympics
Smith competed at the 1952 Summer Olympics in Helsinki where he received a gold medal in Freestyle wrestling, competing in the welterweight class.

References

1928 births
2018 deaths
Wrestlers at the 1952 Summer Olympics
American male sport wrestlers
Olympic gold medalists for the United States in wrestling
Wrestlers from Oregon
Medalists at the 1952 Summer Olympics
Sportspeople from Portland, Oregon